Sweden established colonies in the Americas in the mid-17th century, including the colony of New Sweden (1638–1655) on the Delaware River in what is now Delaware, New Jersey, Pennsylvania, and Maryland, as well as two possessions in the Caribbean during the 18th and 19th centuries.

North America
The colony of New Sweden was founded in 1638 by the first expedition of Swedish South Company, a consortium of Swedish, Dutch and German business interests formed in 1637. The colony was located along the Delaware River with settlements in modern Delaware (e.g., Wilmington), Pennsylvania (e.g., Philadelphia) and New Jersey (e.g., New Stockholm and Swedesboro) along locations where Swedish and Dutch traders had been visiting for decades.

At the time (until 1809) Finland was part of the Kingdom of Sweden, and some of the settlers of Sweden's colonies came from present-day Finland or were Finnish-speaking. The Swedes and Finns brought their log house design to America, where it became the typical log cabin of pioneers. The Swedish colonists established a trading relationship with the Susquehannock, and supported them in their successful war against Maryland colonists.

While a Baltic naval power, the international power of the Swedish Empire was rooted in land based military power, and when another general war engulfed northern Europe, the Swedish Royal Navy was incapable of protecting the colony. Subsequently, the young colony was eventually annexed by the Dutch, who perceived the presence of Swedish colonists in North America as a threat to their interests in the New Netherland colony.

Caribbean 
The Swedish colony of Saint Barthélemy (1784–1878) was operated as a porto franco (free port). The capital city of Gustavia retains its Swedish name. Guadeloupe (1813–1814) came into Swedish possession as a consequence of the Napoleonic Wars. It gave rise to the Guadeloupe Fund.

Other settlements
Swedish emigrants continued to go to the Americas to settle within other countries or colonies. The mid-19th and early 20th centuries saw a large Swedish emigration to the United States. Approximately 1.3 million Swedes settled in the U.S. during that period, and there are currently about four million Swedish-Americans, as of 2008.

Dom Pedro II, the second Emperor of Brazil, encouraged immigration, resulting in a sizeable number of Swedes entering Brazil, settling mainly in the cities of Joinville and Ijuí. In the late 19th century, Misiones Province in Argentina was a major centre for Swedish immigration, and laid the foundations of a population of Swedish-Argentines.

See also
 Swedish overseas colonies
 Possessions of Sweden
 Swedish Empire
 Colonial governors in 1816
 Swedish Argentines

References

Other sources
Barton, H. Arnold (1994) A Folk Divided: Homeland Swedes and Swedish Americans, 1840–1940. (Uppsala: Acta Universitatis Upsaliensis).
Benson, Adolph B. and Naboth Hedin, eds. (1938) Swedes in America, 1638–1938 (New Haven, CT: Yale University Press) 
Johnson, Amandus (1927)  The Swedes on the Delaware (International Printing Company, Philadelphia)

Related reading
 Jameson, J. Franklin (1887) Willem Usselinx: Founder of the Dutch and Swedish West India Companies (G.P. Putnam's Sons)

External links
The New Sweden Centre, museum tours and reenactors.
 Mémoire St Barth | History of St Barthélemy (archives & history of slavery, slave trade and their abolition), Comité de Liaison et d'Application des Sources Historiques.

Americas
European colonization of the Americas
Sweden–United States relations
Swedish-American history